John Schickel (born March 29, 1954) is an American Republican politician. He is a member of the Kentucky State Senate,  being first elected in 2008.

Schickel earned an M.P.A. degree from Northern Kentucky University. A retired law enforcement officer, he served as a Florence police officer for over a decade, the Boone County jailer from 1987 through 2001, and a U.S. marshal for the Eastern District of Kentucky from 2002 through 2008.

Senator Schickel has filed suit to overturn a $1000 (one thousand dollar) limit on undisclosed gifts to elected officials in Kentucky—as a violation of the First and Fourteenth Amendments of the U.S. Constitution.

References

External links
 Senate District 11: Senator John Schickel (R) at Kentucky Legislature

1954 births
Living people
Republican Party Kentucky state senators
Northern Kentucky University alumni
People from Union County, Kentucky
21st-century American politicians